Daniel Greenberg is a video game and role-playing game designer and author. He has worked with publishing companies such as Palladium Books, Mayfair Games, Pulsar Games, and Last Unicorn Games, but probably most extensively with White Wolf on supplements to the Vampire: The Masquerade and other storyteller games. He has also written scripts for numerous video games, including: X-Men: The Mutant Wars, Vampire: The Masquerade - Redemption, Tenchu 2: Birth Of The Stealth Assassins, Star Control 3, Star Trek: Starfleet Academy, and many others, including educational titles for The Walt Disney Company.

References

External links 
 
 Interview through Gamasutra
Pen & Paper RPG Database: Daniel Greenberg 

Role-playing game designers
Living people
Video game designers
Video game writers
Voice directors
Year of birth missing (living people)